Professor Ute Roessner  (born 1971) is a biochemist who specialises in plant metabolomics. Until 2022, she has been professor and head of the School of Biosciences at the University of Melbourne. In 2022, she joined The Australian National University in Canberra, Australia.

Early life and career 
Roessner received a Diploma in Biochemistry, from the University of Potsdam and the John Innes Institute in Norwich, in the UK. She then was awarded a PhD in Plant Biochemistry, from the Max-Planck-Institute for Molecular Plant Physiology in Germany.

Her career involves conducting work in metabolomics, biochemistry and lipidomics, as well as mass spectrometry. Roessner played a role in establishing a metabolomics platform research in 2003, within the Australian Centre for Plant Functional Genomics, and also in 2007, in Metabolomics Australia.

Roessner's research has received media attention, from her early life in East Berlin, regarding the Berlin Wall coming down, as well as a Nature paper on the genome of Chenopodium quinoa  and research on insecticides, showing low doses of insecticides can reduce insect survival rates. Roessner was also involved in research on how invasive fungal diseases, which can be life-threatening, can be able to adapt and then survive within human populations.

Roessner's research has involved using mass spectrometry to understand spatial metabolite and the analysis of lipids, to further understanding of the metabolism of roots under saline stress. Roessner has been awarded funding for mass spectrometry research on lipids, metabolites and proteins in plants. She has been head of school, Biosciences at the University of Melbourne, between 2018 and 2022.

In 2021 Roessner was appointed a Member of the Order of Australia the Queen's Birthday Honours for "significant service to tertiary education, particularly to the biosciences". She was inducted onto the Victorian Honour Roll of Women as a Trailblazer in 2021 and elected a Fellow of the Australian Academy of Science in 2022.

Prizes and awards

References

External links 
 Roessner lab
 

1971 births
Living people
Australian women scientists
Australian women academics
Members of the Order of Australia
Fellows of the Australian Academy of Science